The Daughters of Men is a 1914 American silent drama film directed by George W. Terwilliger, from a screenplay by Lawrence McCloskey.  The film stars Percy Winter, William H. Turner, and Gaston Bell.

Cast list
Percy Winter as Daniel Crosby
 William H. Turner as Uncle Milbank
Gaston Bell as Matthew Crosby
George Soule Spencer as John Stedman
Arthur Matthews as James Thedford
Earl Metcalfe as Jem Burress
Ethel Clayton as Louise Stolbeck
Robert Dunba as Louis Stolbeck
Kempton Greene as Reginald Crosby
Bernard Siegel as Oscar Lackett
James Daly as President McCarthy
Lila Leslie as Lilie LeslieGrace Crosby
Mabel Greene as Bella

References

Silent American drama films
Films directed by George Terwilliger
American black-and-white films
1914 films
1914 drama films
1910s English-language films
1910s American films